East Hills Boys High School (abbreviated as EHBHS) known until 2011 as East Hills Boys Technology High School, is a boys school in Panania, a suburb in south-western Sydney, New South Wales, Australia, on Lucas Road. It is a single-sex boys' high school operated by the New South Wales Department of Education with students from years 7 to 12. The school was established in 1955.

School history
The school was established in 1955 and was officially opened on 26 May 1956 by the Minister for Education, Bob Heffron. The first headmaster from 1955 to his retirement in 1963 was Michael Stephen Cannon. Heffron also officially opened the new assembly hall on 6 August 1959, with the hall subsequently named the "R. J. Heffron Hall" in his honour.

Principals

Notable alumni 
 Glenn Brookespolitician; Liberal Member for East Hills, since 2011
 John Dale former president of the Australian Dental Association
 Lyall GormanCEO of the Cronulla-Sutherland Sharks and former A-League executive
 Wayne Holdsworthformer member of the New South Wales Cricket Team
 Andy Patmoreformer rugby league player
 Corey Richardsformer member of the New South Wales Cricket Team
 Tanveer Sangha T20 Cricketer in the BBL
 Ian Thorpe swimmer; five time Olympic champion, eleven time World Champion, four times World Swimmer of the Year, 2000 Young Australian of the Year
 Jackson Topinerugby league player 
 Scott McKenzie  2011/12 Late Model Racing Queensland (LMRQ) Rookie of the Year.
 Mark Waugh former cricketer who held the world record for most catches in Test matches from 2001 until 2009 (181)
 Steve Waugh former captain of Australian cricket team, the most capped Test player and most prolific winning captain in history
Graham Windeattsilver medallist in 1500m freestyle at 1972 Summer Olympics

Notable former staff 
 Bill Collins former English teacher; film critic and historian, radio and television presenter
 John Dysonformer computing and IT teacher - Australian one day and test cricketer, and current West Indian team coach
 Peter Hadfieldformer sportsmaster – Australian Olympic and Commonwealth decathlon athlete
 Tracey Menziesformer art and physical education teacher – swimming coach, most known for coaching Ian Thorpe, and at the Australian Institute of Sport

See also

 List of government schools in New South Wales
 East Hills Girls Technology High School
 Education in Australia

References

External links
 
 New South Wales Department of Education – East Hills Boys High School

Public high schools in Sydney
Boys' schools in New South Wales
South Western Sydney
Educational institutions established in 1955
1955 establishments in Australia